Mysticarion is a genus of air-breathing, tree-dwelling land snails, terrestrial arboreal pulmonate gastropod molluscs in the subfamily Helicarioninae  of the family Helicarionidae.

Species
Species within the genus Mysticarion include:
 Mysticarion hyalinus (L. Pfeiffer, 1855)
 Mysticarion insuetus - the type subspecies 
 Mysticarion leucospira (Pfeiffer, 1857) - type species
 Mysticarion obscurior Hyman, Lamborena & Köhler, 2017
 Mysticarion porrectus (Iredale, 1941)
Species brought into synonymy
 Mysticarion huberi Thach, 2016: synonym of Megaustenia huberi (Thach, 2016) (original combination)
 Mysticarion leucospira (L. Pfeiffer, 1857) : synonym of Microkerkus leucospira (L. Pfeiffer, 1857) (superseded combination)

References

External links 
 n I.T., de la Iglesia Lamborena I. & Köhler F. (2017). Molecular phylogenetics and systematic revision of the south-eastern Australian Helicarionidae (Gastropoda, Stylommatophora). Contributions to Zoology. 86(1): 51-95
 Australian Biological Resources Study page: 
 Zipcodezoo info: 

Helicarionidae